Spiraculata is an order of Blastoids. These blastoids are characterized by indirect entrance to the hydrospires through canals by way of pores.

Genera

Acentrotremites
Ambolostoma
Arcuoblastus
Auloblastus
Belocrinus
Calycoblastus
Carpenteroblastus
Conuloblastus
Cordyloblastus
Costatoblastus
Cribroblastus
Cryptoblastus
Decemoblastus
Deliablastus
Deltoblastus
Dentiblastus
Devonoblastus,
Diploblastus
Doryblastus
Elaeacrinus
Eleutherocrinus
Ellipticoblastus
Euryoblastus
Globoblastus
Gongyloblastus
Granatocrinus
Heteroblastus
Houiblastus
Iranoblastus
Kadiskoblastus
Lophoblastus
Malchiblastus
Metablastus
Monadoblastus
Monoblastus
Monoschizablastus
Montanablastus
Nodoblastus
Nucleocrinus
Orbiblastus
Orbitremites
Pentephyllum
Pentremites
Pentremoblastus
Perittoblastus
Placoblastus
Poroblastus
Ptychoblastus
Pyramiblastus
Rhopaloblastus
Schizoblastidae
Schizoblastus
Schizotremites
Sinopetaloblastus
Strongyloblastus
Tanablastus
Tricoelocrinus
Troosticrinus
Uyguroblastus
Xinjiangoblastus
Xyeleblastus

References 

Blastozoa
Prehistoric animal orders
Echinoderm orders